Cladosporium halotolerans is a fungus found in hypersaline environments. It has globoid conidia. It has also been isolated from bathrooms and in a dolphin.

References

Cladosporium
Fungi described in 2007